

Historical bridges

Architectural bridges

Major bridges

Major footbridges

Notes and References 
 Notes

 

 

 

 Others references

See also 

 Transport in Japan
 List of bridges in Kyoto
 土木学会田中賞  - Liste des prix de la Société des ingénieurs civils Tanaka

External links 

  - List of bridges that received the Tanaka Prize
  - List of Japanese bridges

Further reading 
 
 
 

Japan

Bridges
b